A corgee is an obsolete unit of mass equal to 212 moodahs, or rush mat bundles of rice. The unit was used in the Canara (now Kanara) region of Karnataka in India.

See also
List of customary units of measurement in South Asia
 List of obsolete units of measurement

References

Further reading
 

Units of mass
Customary units in India
Obsolete units of measurement